The Typhoon Tracy Stakes is a Moonee Valley Racing Club Group 3 Australian Thoroughbred horse race for three year old fillies, at set weights with penalties, over a distance of 1200 metres.  It is held at Moonee Valley Racecourse in Melbourne, Australia in late February.  Prize money is A$200,000.

History
The race is run on a Friday night under lights since inception.

Name
The race is named after 2009–2010 Australian Racehorse of the Year, Typhoon Tracy, who won the Myer Classic, C F Orr Stakes, Futurity Stakes and Queen Of The Turf Stakes during the season. The mare died while giving birth to her first foal at Vinery Stud in the NSW Hunter Valley in 2012.

Grade
2011–2013 - Listed Race
2014 onwards - Group 3

Winners

 2022 - Hellfest 
 2021 - Macroura 
 2020 - Ms Catherine 
 2019 - Embrace Me 
 2018 - Tulip
 2017 - Brugal Reward
 2016 - Almighty Girl
 2015 - Written Dash
 2014 - Jazz Song
 2013 - Norzita
 2012 - Glows
 2011 - Miss Gai Flyer

See also
 List of Australian Group races
 Group races

References

Horse races in Australia